Inigo Philbrick (born 1987) is an American art dealer who was jailed for wire fraud in May 2022 for seven years, and ordered to forfeit $86.7 million.

Early life
Inigo Philbrick is the son of Harry Philbrick, who was the director of The Aldrich Contemporary Art Museum in Ridgefield, Connecticut, from 1996 to 2010. Philbrick was educated at Joel Barlow High School in Redding, Connecticut, and graduated in 2005. He studied art at Goldsmiths, University of London, as his father did before him.

Career
In 2006, he began an internship at London's White Cube gallery. He later become their head of secondary-market sales at the gallery. 

In October 2011, with backing from White Cube's owner, Jay Jopling, he set up Modern Collections at 89 Mount Street in London's Mayfair, focusing on the secondary market for the work of contemporary artists. His first show included work by Kelley Walker and Wade Guyton (neither were White Cube artists). 

In 2013, Philbrick started his own business, and Jopling continued to provide financial support. Artists traded included Rudolf Stingel, Christopher Wool, and Mike Kelley. Philbrick had galleries in London and Miami.

Philbrick was later determined to have engaged in various fraudulent practices. These included selling shares in a single piece of art to multiple investors resulting in the sold shares totaling more than 100 percent; selling artworks or using them as loan collateral  without the knowledge of their owners; and providing "fraudulent" documents to "artificially inflate the value of artworks."

In June 2020, Philbrick was arrested after being found by US law enforcement agents, hiding on the Pacific island of Vanuatu. He was charged with wire fraud and aggravated identity theft, and remanded in custody, where he remained until he was sentenced nearly two years later. 

In May 2022, he received a seven-year prison sentence for wire fraud from a federal judge in New York City, and was ordered to pay $86.7 million.

Personal life
The art world people that he worked with included the American artist, academic and writer Kenny Schachter, who has lost more than $1.5 million to Philbrick. Schachter called him a "very talented art dealer", a "mini Madoff" who had "sabotaged his entire life for short-term greed", and fell due to "a toxic mix of arrogance and alcohol". As early as May 2020, Schachter had written off Philbrick as "the Bernie Madoff of the art world".

He is in a relationship with socialite Victoria Baker-Harber (daughter of Michael Baker-Harber), a regular on the British reality television show Made in Chelsea. In November 2020, she gave birth to their daughter.

Previously, he was in a relationship Francisca Mancini, a "Buenos Aires–born art adviser turned perfume maker". They had a daughter together in 2016.

References

1980s births
Living people
Alumni of Goldsmiths, University of London
American art dealers
People from Redding, Connecticut
American fraudsters
American prisoners and detainees
American people convicted of fraud
American male criminals
21st-century American criminals